University of Nottingham Hockey Club is a field hockey club that is based at the University of Nottingham, the club plays at two grounds; the David Ross Sports Village and the Nottingham Hockey Centre.

The club runs six men's teams  with the first XI playing in the Men's England Hockey League Division One North  and six women's teams  with the first XI playing in the Women's England Hockey League Investec Conference North.

Notable players

Men's internationals

References

English field hockey clubs
Sport in Nottingham
Sport in Nottinghamshire